Kirpal Singh Narang was an Indian historian, educationist and the vice-chancellor of Punjabi University. He was the second in line of the vice-chancellors of the university (1966–75) and the longest serving among them. Born on 12 April 1912 in Amritsar in Punjab of the British India, he published several books on the history of Punjab and Sikhs, which included four volumes of Punjab history and a book on Islam. The Government of India awarded him the third highest civilian honour of the Padma Bhushan, in 1975, for his contributions to education and literature.

Selected bibliography

See also 
 Punjabi University

References

External links 
 
 

1912 births
2019 deaths
Recipients of the Padma Bhushan in literature & education
Scholars from Amritsar
20th-century Indian historians
Heads of universities and colleges in India
Year of death missing
20th-century Indian educational theorists
Indian centenarians
Men centenarians